G-protein coupled receptor 4 is a protein that in humans is encoded by the GPR4 gene.

See also
Proton-sensing G protein-coupled receptors

References

Further reading

G protein-coupled receptors